Kayla Renee Rolland (May 12, 1993 – February 29, 2000) was an American six-year-old girl from Mount Morris Township, Michigan, who was fatally shot on February 29, 2000 by a six-year-old male classmate at Buell Elementary School in the Beecher Community School District. The boy had found the gun while living at his uncle's house; the house was a crack house where guns were frequently traded for drugs. 

The killing drew worldwide attention due to the particularly young ages of the victim and the perpetrator: Rolland was the youngest school shooting victim in the United States until the Sandy Hook Elementary School shooting in 2012, and her assailant remains the youngest fatal school shooting perpetrator to date, and the second-youngest school shooting perpetrator in general. The boy was not charged with murder because of his age. Buell Elementary School closed in 2002 and was demolished in 2009.

Background  

Kayla Rolland was killed by a six-year-old male first grader at Buell Elementary School in the Beecher Community School District, located in Mount Morris Township, Michigan, near Flint. His father, Dedric Owens, was in jail for violating his parole, having previously been convicted for possession of cocaine with intent to deliver and burglary. The boy had been living with his mother, Tamarla, and his eight-year-old brother. She was evicted from her home, having been unable to pay rent with the $175 weekly wage she received from the two jobs she worked under Michigan's welfare-to-work program, and both boys then shared a single sofa as a bed at their uncle's house. The home, where his uncle lived with a 19-year-old man, was a crack house where guns were frequently traded for drugs. At some point, the child found a loaded Davis Industries P-32 .32-caliber handgun under some blankets.

The boy was known to have behavioral issues, and was made to stay after school nearly every day for swearing, giving people the finger, pinching, and hitting. Some weeks before the shooting he stabbed a girl with a pencil. Chris Boaz, a seven-year-old classmate, claimed the boy once punched him because he would not give him a pickle. The boy had previously attacked Kayla Rolland and, on the day prior to the killing, tried to kiss her and was rebuffed. Early on the day of the shooting, the boy and his brother got into a fight with Boaz's uncle, whom the boy threatened to shoot.

Shooting  

On February 29, 2000, the boy had brought the firearm, along with a knife, with him to school. Further in the day, during a change of classes, he fatally shot six-year-old Kayla Rolland in the presence of a teacher and 22 students while they were moving up a floor on the stairs, saying to her: "I don't like you", before pulling the trigger. The bullet entered her right arm and traveled through a vital artery. At 10:29 a.m. EST, Rolland was pronounced dead at Hurley Medical Center while in cardiac arrest. He then threw the handgun into a trash basket and fled to a nearby restroom. He was found there, in the corner, by a teacher and was taken into police custody soon after. He was held in custody until the Genesee County Family Independence Agency could determine his placement. He and his two younger siblings were subsequently placed with an aunt.

Legal 
Her assailant became the youngest school shooter in the United States, and based on the legal claim that at that age he would lack the ability to form intent, he was not charged with the murder. In most U.S. states, six-year-olds are not liable for crimes they commit, and the Genesee County Prosecutor Arthur Busch called on the citizens to collectively hug the boy, presumably out of pity and sympathy. In an 1893 ruling, the U.S. Supreme Court declared that "children under the age of seven years could not be guilty of felony, or punished for any capital offense, for within that age the child is conclusively presumed incapable of committing a crime." This is followed in many U.S. states. 

Jamelle James, the uncle who owned the .32-caliber pistol used in the shooting, was sentenced for leaving the gun in a shoe box in his bedroom. He eventually pleaded no contest to involuntary manslaughter and spent two years and five months in prison before he was released on probation. The other adults involved would be in and out of court systems in the years to follow. A search of James's house produced a loaded pump-action shotgun and a rock of crack cocaine.

On the twentieth anniversary of the shooting on February 29, 2020, news media reported that the boy who shot Kayla Rolland was living in Bay City, Michigan. According to court records, he had been convicted at age 18 of a felony in connection with charges of second-degree home invasion and larceny at a Bay City house on April 23, 2012.

Aftermath
At the time, Kayla Rolland was believed to have been the youngest school shooting victim in United States history, which was not surpassed until the Sandy Hook Elementary School shooting in December 2012.  A day after Rolland's death a shooting spree occurred in Wilkinsburg, Pennsylvania that killed three and injured two others. In response to the Wilkinsburg case, U.S. President Bill Clinton argued for stricter gun laws and mentioned Rolland's case as an example.

Buell Elementary closed in 2002 due to dwindling enrollment and stressed finances. The campus was heavily damaged by arson in 2005, and was demolished in 2009.

Depiction in media 
Rolland's killing was cited by Michael Moore in his 2002 film Bowling for Columbine, which argued for stricter gun control.

See also

 List of youngest killers
 List of school shootings in the United States
 List of homicides in Michigan
 Shooting of Abby Zwerner, another school shooting that is also committed by a six-year-old in Newport News, Virginia

References

External links
 

2000 crimes in the United States
2000 murders in the United States
Genesee County, Michigan
Murder committed by minors
Incidents of violence against girls
Deaths by person in Michigan
Elementary school shootings in the United States
February 2000 events in the United States